Gabriel Jesús Morales (born 29 April 1994) is an Argentine professional footballer who plays as a midfielder for Boca Unidos.

Career
Morales began in the academy of Rosario Central, before joining Atlético de Rafaela's youth in 2014. He made his Argentine Primera División debut for Rafaela on 10 April 2015 against Crucero del Norte and scored his first career goal in the process. He made a further fifteen appearances and scored one more goal during the 2015 season. Rafaela were relegated at the end of the 2016–17 season, Morales had made just two league appearances during that season and was subsequently released in July 2017. He then joined second tier team Boca Unidos in August, and made his debut for them on 7 October versus Deportivo Riestra.

After three seasons with Boca Unidos, Morales departed in August 2020 to Almagro.

Career statistics
.

References

External links

1994 births
Living people
Footballers from Rosario, Santa Fe
Argentine footballers
Association football midfielders
Argentine Primera División players
Primera Nacional players
Torneo Federal A players
Atlético de Rafaela footballers
Boca Unidos footballers
Club Almagro players